Josh Fraser (born 5 January 1982) is a former professional Australian rules footballer who played for the Collingwood Football Club and Gold Coast Football Club in the Australian Football League (AFL).

Playing career
From Mansfield via Murray U18, Fraser was the number one pick in the 1999 National Draft, going to Collingwood. Fraser played 21 games in his first season. He won an AFL Rising Star nomination in his debut year. He played all 25 games in 2002, kicked 37 goals and played in the Grand Final team where he kicked three goals, following a three-goal haul in the Preliminary Final. In 2003 he had over 340 disposals in the season, 300 hit outs and kicked 20 goals.

Fraser played all 23 games in 2006, having 341 hit outs for the year, his best return. He kicked 16 goals, averaged more than 17 touches a game, more than 7 marks a game, and 15 hit outs. He finished fourth in the Copeland Trophy, along with Heath Shaw, only three votes behind the eventual winner Alan Didak.

In 2007, Josh Fraser did not miss a game until Round 20 against Melbourne, his second last game for the season. He returned for the Elimination Final win against  before withdrawing late against  the next week, his last game for the season.

In 2008, Fraser was named Scott Burns' vice-captain.

In 2010, Fraser played nine games for the club, and he lost his first-choice ruckman position to new recruit Darren Jolly. He played his 200th game for Collingwood in the round 22 clash against Hawthorn.

At the conclusion of the season, Fraser was picked up by Gold Coast, ending his tenure with Collingwood. In Fraser's first season at the Suns he played 16 games, with an average of 14.8 disposals and 13.3 hit outs per game. His main role at the Suns was to support and develop the young, emerging ruckmen at the club.

Fraser's AFL playing career ended when he resigned from the Gold Coast Suns on 29 August 2012. He played 18 games for the club.

Post-playing career
Following the end of his playing career in 2012, Fraser expressed interest in football coaching roles and stated that wanted to establish a long-term coaching career. He  has completed two coaching courses; Level Two Coaches Course and Next Coach Program.

In 2013, Fraser was a part-time AFL commentator on ABC radio.

In January 2014, Fraser commenced his coaching career when he was appointed coach of the Gold Coast Sun's reserves team that plays in the North East Australian Football League (NEAFL).

He signed to serve as development coach at the Carlton Football Club in 2016, and within that role served as coach of its  club, the Northern Blues. He remained with the club until the start of the 2020 season, at which point the impacts of the COVID-19 pandemic saw Carlton end its connection with the Northern Blues and make Fraser redundant. In 2021, the VFL club re-established itself under its previous identity, the Northern Bullants, and Fraser remained with the club as its senior coach. After two seasons coaching the Bullants, Fraser was appointed coach of Collingwood's VFL team ahead of the 2023 season.

In 2016 Fraser joined the Tatyoon Football Club, who won the premiership with Fraser kicking 8.6 goals in a best on ground effort.

Personal life
Fraser married long time girlfriend Kylie Sutcliffe in December 2008 in Port Melbourne. They have 2 children, Ted (born in 2009) and Emmy (born in 2013).

References

External links 

 
 Gold Coast Suns NEAFL team

1982 births
Living people
Collingwood Football Club players
Gold Coast Football Club players
Australian rules footballers from Victoria (Australia)
Murray Bushrangers players
Preston Football Club (VFA) coaches
Mansfield Football Club players